Chepigana is a corregimiento in Chepigana District, Darién Province, Panama with a population of 704 as of 2010. Its population as of 1990 was 742; its population as of 2000 was 582.

Notable  residents
Alfonso Lopez, WBA world Flyweight boxing champion

References

Corregimientos of Darién Province
Road-inaccessible communities of Panama